As part of the 2009 American Recovery and Reinvestment Act (signed Feb 17, 2009), the United States Government has allocated Small Business Administration (SBA) backed funds for viable small businesses in the United States. Businesses must have qualifying business loans and must be experiencing immediate financial hardship.  Qualifying recipients of the America’s Recovery Capital (ARC) Loan Program may receive up to $35,000 in short-term relief.  Each small business is limited to one ARC loan. 

ARC loans can be used to make payments of principal and interest, in full or in part, on one or more existing, qualifying small business loans for up to six months. ARC loans are intended to provide immediate capital to small businesses to make payments (principal and interest) on existing debt and thus allow business owners to sustain and retain jobs. 
ARC loans are interest-free to the borrower and carry a 100% guarantee from the SBA. Loan proceeds are provided over a six-month period. Repayment of the ARC loan principal is deferred for 12 months after the last disbursement (18 months from the first disbursement), followed by a repayment period of five years. 

Good candidates for ARC loans are small businesses that can show a profitable past but are currently struggling to make loan payments or are just beginning to miss loan payments due to financial hardship.

ARC loans are made by participating commercial SBA lenders. The SBA will pay these banks a monthly interest rate throughout the term of the loan.  ARC loans will be offered by some SBA lenders for as long as funding is available or until September 30, 2010, whichever comes first.

Eligibility

In order to be eligible, a small business must be established, have financial statements to demonstrate it was profitable in one of the past two years, and be able to project sufficient cash flow to meet current and future loan payments over a two-year period from loan approval.  ARC loans are not designed for start-up businesses.   
Examples of qualifying loans may include business credit card obligations, capital leases, notes payable to vendors or suppliers, Development Company Loan Program (504) first-lien loans, other loans to small businesses made without an SBA guaranty, and loans made by or with an SBA guaranty on or after Feb. 17, 2009. 
Borrowers with loans that are already severely delinquent or whose past performance or future cash flow projection indicates that the business is not viable will not be a good candidate for an ARC loan.

Application
 
ARC Loans are provided by participating commercial lenders and guaranteed by the SBA.  Your next step is to contact your lender to determine whether or not they are participating.  If they are, they may ask questions such as: 

Has your small business been in operation for a minimum of two years?
Do you have financial statements (balance sheet, income statement, and cash flow statement) that indicate your business was in a positive cash
flow position in one of the past two years (or as long as your business has been operating, if less than two years)?
Do your cash flow projections for the next two years indicate sufficient funds to meet both current and future loan obligations?
Is your business suffering an immediate financial hardship?  (Declining sales and revenues; Difficulty in making loan payments on existing debt;  Difficulty in paying employees; Difficulty in purchasing materials, supplies, or inventory; and/or Difficulty in paying rent and/or other operating expenses).

External links
SBA.gov page on ARC loan program

Small Business Administration